Jamie Murphy (born 13 April 1981 in Saint John, New Brunswick) is a Canadian curler from Dartmouth, Nova Scotia. He is a former skip, and played at his first Brier in 2012.

Career
Jamie Murphy, originally from Quispamsis,  is a former junior curler, representing New Brunswick at the Canadian Junior Championships in 2001 and 2002.

Murphy's team had a notable 2010 season, losing in the semifinal of the Nova Scotia Men's Provincial Championship that year.

In 2012 the team captured their provincial championship, defeating former Brier champion Mark Dacey. This earned Murphy's team their first trip to the Brier.

Teams

Personal life
Murphy's sister, Jeanette Murphy, is also a successful curler, listed as an alternate with Andrea Kelly's New Brunswick women's championship winning team. He works as a general manager with ADESA Halifax. He is married and has two children.

References

External links

 Nova Scotia Men's Champions
 New Brunswick Junior Men's Champions

Living people
Curlers from Nova Scotia
Curlers from New Brunswick
1981 births
Sportspeople from Dartmouth, Nova Scotia
Sportspeople from Fredericton
Canadian male curlers
Sportspeople from Saint John, New Brunswick